The 2020 United States Senate election in New Mexico was held on November 3, 2020, to elect a member of the United States Senate to represent the State of New Mexico, concurrently with the 2020 U.S. presidential election, as well as other elections to the United States Senate in other states, elections to the United States House of Representatives, and various state and local elections.

On March 25, 2019, incumbent Democratic Senator Tom Udall announced that he would retire. Udall was the only Democratic senator who did not run for reelection in 2020. Democratic U.S. Representative Ben Ray Luján defeated Mark Ronchetti by a 6.1% margin. Luján underperformed Democratic presidential nominee Joe Biden by 4.6%, who won the concurrent presidential election in the state against President Donald Trump by 10.8%.

Democratic primary

Candidates

Nominee
Ben Ray Luján, incumbent U.S. Representative for New Mexico's 3rd congressional district

Withdrew
Giovanni Haqani, businessman, television host, and candidate for state representative in 2016
Andrew Perkins, accountant and former Española finance director
Maggie Toulouse Oliver, incumbent Secretary of State of New Mexico (endorsed Ben Ray Luján)

Declined
Jeff Apodaca, businessman and candidate for Governor in 2018
Hector Balderas, Attorney General of New Mexico
Terry Brunner, former United States Department of Agriculture regional director
Pete Campos, state senator
Jacob Candelaria, state senator
Joe Cervantes, state senator and candidate for governor in 2018
Brian Egolf, speaker of the New Mexico House of Representatives
Deb Haaland, U.S. Representative (endorsed Ben Ray Luján); (running for re-election)
Tim Keller, mayor of Albuquerque
Michelle Lujan Grisham, Governor of New Mexico (endorsed Ben Ray Luján)
Howie Morales, Lieutenant Governor of New Mexico
Valerie Plame, former CIA operations officer
Jeff Steinborn, state senator
Xochitl Torres Small, U.S. Representative
Raúl Torrez, Bernalillo County district attorney (running for re-election)
Tom Udall, incumbent U.S. Senator (endorsed Ben Ray Luján)
Alan Webber, mayor of Santa Fe

Endorsements

Polling

Results

Republican primary

Candidates

Nominee
Mark Ronchetti, former KRQE chief meteorologist

Eliminated in primary
Gavin Clarkson, former professor at New Mexico State University and nominee for New Mexico Secretary of State in 2018
Elisa Martinez, member of the Navajo Nation and executive director of the New Mexico Alliance for Life

Withdrawn
Rick Montoya, businessman
Mick Rich, businessman and nominee for the U.S. Senate in 2018
Louie Sanchez, indoor shooting range owner

Declined
Rod Adair, former state senator
Richard J. Berry, former mayor of Albuquerque
Kevin DuPriest, businessman, data scientist
Kelly Fajardo, state representative
Nate Gentry, minority leader of the New Mexico House of Representatives
Michael Hendricks, attorney and nominee for Attorney General in 2018
Yvette Herrell, former state representative and nominee for New Mexico's 2nd congressional district in 2018 (Herrell is running for U.S. House of Representatives CD2)
David Hyder, Valencia County Commissioner
Sarah Maestas Barnes, former state representative
Steve Maestas, real estate developer
Susana Martinez, former Governor of New Mexico
Mark Moores, state senator
Judith Nakamura, New Mexico Supreme Court justice
Steve Pearce, chair of the New Mexico Republican Party, former U.S. Representative, nominee for the U.S. Senate in 2008, and nominee for governor in 2018
John Sanchez, former Lieutenant Governor of New Mexico

Polling

Results

Other candidates

Libertarian Party

Nominee
Bob Walsh, nuclear safety scientist

Declined
Gary Johnson, former Governor of New Mexico and nominee for U.S. Senate in 2018

Results

General election

Debate

Predictions

Endorsements

Polling

Ben Ray Luján vs. Gavin Clarkson

Generic Democrat vs. generic Republican

Results

Counties that flipped from Democratic to Republican
 Colfax (largest municipality: Raton)
 Harding (largest municipality: Roy)
 Hidalgo (largest municipality: Lordsburg)
 Luna (largest municipality: Deming)
 Valencia (largest municipality: Los Lunas)

See also
 2020 New Mexico elections

Notes
Partisan clients

Voter samples

References

External links
 
 
  (State affiliate of the U.S. League of Women Voters)
 

Official campaign websites
 Ben Ray Luján (D) for Senate
 Mark Ronchetti (R) for Senate
 Bob Walsh (L) for Senate

2020
New Mexico
United States Senate
Open seats in the 2020 United States Senate elections